A regional election took place in Picardy on March 21 and March 28, 2004, along with all other regions. Claude Gewerc (PS) was elected President of the former Council of Picardy (now merged to Regional Council of Hauts-de-France), defeating incumbent Gilles de Robien.

Results

References 

Picardy regional election